Alumim, also distributed under the English title Unknowns, is an Israeli television series broadcast on Kan 11. Created by Guy Sidis, Nirit Yaron, and Tawfik Abu Wael, the series is based on the experiences of Sidis in a school for at-risk students and Abu Wael's childhood in a disadvantaged community in Israel.

The show began broadcasting on 4 October 2021 and concluded its first season on 1 November 2021. On the night of the finale, it was publicized that due to its success the show was expected to be renewed for a second season.

As of July 2022, Alumum had been acquired for broadcast in  France, Australia, Spain, Portugal, Belgium, and Luxemburg.

Plot 
The show centers around a group of boys at a school for at-risk youth in Beit Shemesh who become suspects in a criminal investigation after a girl is found dazed and beaten in a nearby forest.

Awards 
Alumim was nominated for 13 awards at the Israeli Television Academy Awards in 2021 of which it won 3, including Best Drama Series and Best Lead Actor in a Drama Series (for Amir Tessler).

The show was also selected to competed in the Cannes International Series Festival in 2021.

References 

Israeli drama television series
Kan 11 original programming
2020s Israeli television series debuts